Sydney-Gipps was an electoral district of the Legislative Assembly in the Australian state of New South Wales, created in 1894 in inner Sydney, replacing part of the former multi-member electorate of West Sydney, and named after Governor George Gipps. It included the Rocks, west of George Street and generally north of Margaret Street. It was abolished in 1904 and absorbed into Darling Harbour.

Members for Sydney-Gipps

Election results

References

Former electoral districts of New South Wales
Constituencies established in 1894
1894 establishments in Australia
Constituencies disestablished in 1904
1904 disestablishments in Australia